Gyeonggi Broadcasting Corporation (KFM 99.9) (callsign HLDS-FM), is a broadcasting company headquartered in Suwon, Gyeonggi, Korea, established on January 15, 1997, then launched on December 2, 1997. It is an FM radio broadcaster in Seoul, Incheon, Gyeonggi, tele number is KFM frequency is 99.9 MHz, over power from 5 kW if similar broadcast network at KBS, MBC, SBS (Korea).

On the midnight of March 30, 2020, KFM 99.9 MHz has ceased operation, after 23 years of radio broadcasting. The last program before closing down is 8090 Concert.

See also 
 KBS Classic FM
 KBS Cool FM
 Gugak FM

References 

Mass media in Suwon
Radio stations in South Korea
Radio stations established in 1997
Radio stations disestablished in 2020
Defunct mass media in South Korea